Onurlu can refer to:

 Onurlu, Alaplı
 Onurlu, Refahiye